Rugby in Italy may refer to:

Rugby league in Italy
Rugby union in Italy